Heterocentrotus trigonarius, commonly known as the slate pencil urchin or red slate pencil urchin, is found in the tropical waters of the Indo-Pacific region.

Heterocentrotus mamillatus is a similar, related species.

References

 UC Berkeley Moorea Biocode listing
 World Register of Marine Species listing

Heterocentrotus
Animals described in 1816